The enzyme succinyl-CoA hydrolase (EC 3.1.2.3) catalyzes the reaction

succinyl-CoA + H2O  CoA + succinate

This enzyme belongs to the family of hydrolases, specifically those acting on thioester bonds.  The systematic name is succinyl-CoA hydrolase. Other names in common use include succinyl-CoA acylase, succinyl coenzyme A hydrolase, and succinyl coenzyme A deacylase.  This enzyme participates in the tricaboxylate cycle.

References

 

EC 3.1.2
Enzymes of unknown structure